Yoshimatsu is both a masculine Japanese given name and a Japanese surname.

Possible writings
Yoshimatsu can be written using different combinations of kanji characters. Here are some examples: 

義松, "justice, pine tree"
義末, "justice, end"
佳松, "skilled, pine tree"
佳末, "skilled, end"
善松, "virtuous, pine tree"
善末, "virtuous, end"
吉松, "good luck, pine tree"
吉末, "good luck, end"
良松, "good, pine tree"
良末, "good, end"
恭松, "respectful, pine tree"
嘉松, "excellent, pine tree"
嘉末, "excellent, end"
能松, "capacity, pine tree"
喜松, "rejoice, pine tree"

The name can also be written in hiragana よしまつ or katakana ヨシマツ.

Notable people with the given name Yoshimatsu
, Japanese footballer

Notable people with the surname Yoshimatsu
Ikumi Yoshimatsu (吉松 育美, born 1987), Japanese beauty pageant winner
Shigetaro Yoshimatsu (吉松 茂太郎, 1859–19350), Japanese admiral
Takashi Yoshimatsu (吉松 隆, born 1953), Japanese composer
Yoshihiko Yoshimatsu (吉松 義彦, 1920–1988), Japanese judoka

Japanese-language surnames
Japanese masculine given names